Malik Jabari Rose (born November 23, 1974) is an American former professional basketball player. Rose played 13 seasons in the National Basketball Association (NBA), winning championships with the San Antonio Spurs in 1999 and 2003.

High school and college

Rose graduated from Overbrook High School in Philadelphia, the same high school as Wilt Chamberlain. He graduated from Drexel University with All-American honors after leading the Dragons to their lone NCAA Tournament victory with an upset of the University of Memphis 75-63. At Drexel, Malik  averaged over 16 points and 12 rebounds per game throughout his four-year college career. He was a student teacher at Robert E. Lamberton School and Albert M. Greenfield Elementary. In 2011, the 1995-96 men's basketball team, led by Rose, was inducted into the Drexel athletic Hall of Fame.

NBA career

Rose was drafted in 1996 in the second round by the Charlotte Hornets. Rose is the second Drexel basketball player to participate in the NBA, following Michael Anderson. He was signed as a free agent by the San Antonio Spurs in 1997, and quickly became one of their more popular players due to his displays of hustle, defense, and skill despite being undersized.  Rose was on the Spurs' NBA championship teams in 1999 and 2003. On February 24, 2005, Rose was traded along with a pair of first-round draft picks to the New York Knicks for Nazr Mohammed and Jamison Brewer, much to the dismay of Spurs fans. A highlight during his tenure with the Knicks was a 10-point, 15-rebound and 9-assist performance in a 94–93 win over the Charlotte Bobcats on April 18, 2007, just missing a triple-double. After being relegated to a minor supporting role for the Knicks for four years, Rose was traded from the Knicks to the Oklahoma City Thunder on February 19, 2009 for Chris Wilcox.

One of Rose's most memorable games occurred during the opening round of the 2002 Playoffs against the Seattle SuperSonics. With star front court players Tim Duncan and David Robinson out, Rose stepped in as a starter. Bringing the Spurs back from a 26-point half-time deficit, the Spurs eventually lost by 12 but not before making a contest of the game. Malik had 28 points and 13 rebounds for the game.

Post-NBA career

The Oklahoma City Thunder renounced the rights to Rose on December 22, 2009.

Rose joined the Madison Square Garden Network as a pregame analyst for his former Knicks team for the 2009-2010 season. He was also named the color analyst for the NBA Development League team, the Austin Toros, who broadcast their games on television for the first time.

On December 20, 2011, Rose was hired as color commentator for the Philadelphia 76ers television broadcasts. Rose served in this role from 2011 to 2015. On November 15, 2014, Rose made his first appearance for NBA TV. Rose made appearances on NBATV during the 2014–15 season on days when it did not conflict with his 76ers schedule.

On August 12, 2015, Rose was hired as manager of basketball operations for the Atlanta Hawks. On April 11, 2017, Rose was promoted to the general manager of the Erie BayHawks, the Hawks' affiliate in the NBA G League. He was named the G League's Basketball Executive of the Year in his only season with the organization.

In 2018, Rose was hired as an assistant general manager within the Detroit Pistons' organization and left the BayHawks.

In the summer of 2020, Rose stepped down from the Pistons front office to take on a job with the NBA front office as vice president of basketball operations. Rose would be named Head of Basketball Operations for the NBA G-League on January 5, 2022 

Outside of basketball, Rose has been involved in the San Antonio community with his charity work and the San Antonio staple 'Malik's Philly's Phamous' restaurant, specializing in Philadelphia's beloved cheesesteak sandwiches & specialty fries.

NBA career statistics

Regular season

|-
| align="left" | 
| align="left" | Charlotte
| 54 || 1 || 9.7 || .477 || .000 || .613 || 3.0 || .6 || .5 || .3 || 3.0
|-
| align="left" | 
| align="left" | San Antonio
| 53 || 0 || 8.1 || .434 || .333 || .639 || 1.7 || .4 || .4 || .1 || 3.0
|-
| style="text-align:left;background:#afe6ba;"| †
| align="left" | San Antonio
| 47 || 0 || 12.9 || .463 || .000 || .671 || 3.9 || .6 || .9 || .5 || 6.0
|-
| align="left" | 
| align="left" | San Antonio
| 74 || 3 || 18.1 || .457 || .333 || .722 || 4.5 || .6 || .5 || .7 || 6.7
|-
| align="left" | 
| align="left" | San Antonio
| 57 || 9 || 21.4 || .435 || .176 || .713 || 5.4 || .8 || 1.0 || .7 || 7.7
|-
| align="left" | 
| align="left" | San Antonio
| 82 || 1 || 21.0 || .463 || .083 || .720 || 6.0 || .7 || .9 || .5 || 9.4
|-
| style="text-align:left;background:#afe6ba;"| †
| align="left" | San Antonio
| 79 || 13 || 24.5 || .459 || .400 || .791 || 6.4 || 1.6 || .7 || .5 || 10.4
|-
| align="left" | 
| align="left" | San Antonio
| 67 || 13 || 18.7 || .428 || .000 || .813 || 4.8 || 1.0 || .5 || .4 || 7.9
|-
| align="left" | 
| align="left" | San Antonio
| 50 || 1 || 17.2 || .464 || .000 || .697 || 4.5 || .8 || .6 || .2 || 6.3
|-
| align="left" | 
| align="left" | New York
| 26 || 4 || 23.6 || .425 || .167 || .782 || 4.4 || .7 || .6 || .3 || 8.3
|-
| align="left" | 
| align="left" | New York
| 72 || 35 || 15.5 || .374 || 1.000 || .781 || 3.6 || .9 || .6 || .2 || 4.4
|-
| align="left" | 
| align="left" | New York
| 65 || 2 || 12.5 || .398 || .250 || .808 || 2.7 || 1.0 || .4 || .1 || 3.0
|-
| align="left" | 
| align="left" | New York
| 49 || 3 || 10.1 || .367 || .286 || .725 || 2.1 || .6 || .3 || .1 || 3.5
|-
| align="left" | 
| align="left" | New York
| 18 || 0 || 8.9 || .268 || .000 || .727 || 1.7 || .6 || .1 || .1 || 1.7
|-
| align="left" | 
| align="left" | Oklahoma City
| 20 || 0 || 15.7 || .378 || .000 || .800 || 3.3 || 1.3 || .5 || .1 || 5.0
|- class="sortbottom"
| style="text-align:center;" colspan="2"| Career
| 813 || 85 || 16.5 || .437 || .177 || .743 || 4.1 || .8 || .6 || .4 || 6.2

Playoffs

|-
| align="left" | 1997
| align="left" | Charlotte
| 2 || 0 || 6.0 || .500 || .000 || .000 || 2.5 || .5 || .0 || .0 || 2.0
|-
| align="left" | 1998
| align="left" | San Antonio
| 5 || 0 || 3.6 || .667 || .000 || .500 || 1.4 || .2 || .2 || .0 || 2.0
|-
| style="text-align:left;background:#afe6ba;"| 1999†
| align="left" | San Antonio
| 17 || 0 || 11.4 || .368 || .000 || .692 || 2.3 || .2 || .4 || .2 || 2.7
|-
| align="left" | 2000
| align="left" | San Antonio
| 4 || 0 || 20.8 || .444 || .000 || .556 || 4.8 || .3 || .5 || .8 || 5.3
|-
| align="left" | 2001
| align="left" | San Antonio
| 13 || 0 || 16.5 || .418 || .333 || .850 || 3.8 || .3 || .2 || .1 || 4.9
|-
| align="left" | 2002
| align="left" | San Antonio
| 10 || 3 || 29.2 || .479 || .000 || .740 || 7.9 || 1.4 || 1.0 || .5 || 12.9
|-
| style="text-align:left;background:#afe6ba;"| 2003†
| align="left" | San Antonio
| 24 || 0 || 23.3 || .419 || .000 || .766 || 5.8 || 1.0 || .7 || .5 || 9.3
|-
| align="left" | 2004
| align="left" | San Antonio
| 7 || 0 || 8.3 || .250 || .000 || .500 || 2.4 || .9 || .6 || .3 || 1.4
|- class="sortbottom"
| style="text-align:center;" colspan="2"| Career
| 82 || 3 || 17.5 || .427 || .111 || .739 || 4.3 || .7 || .5 || .3 || 6.2

See also
 Drexel Dragons
 List of NCAA Division I men's basketball players with 2000 points and 1000 rebounds
 List of NCAA Division I men's basketball career rebounding leaders

References

External links

Drexel Basketball

1974 births
Living people
20th-century African-American sportspeople
21st-century African-American sportspeople
African-American basketball players
All-American college men's basketball players
American men's basketball players
Basketball players from Philadelphia
Charlotte Hornets draft picks
Charlotte Hornets players
Drexel Dragons men's basketball players
New York Knicks players
Oklahoma City Thunder players
Power forwards (basketball)
San Antonio Spurs players